

See also 
 Geology of Iceland
 Lists of earthquakes

References 

Sources

Further reading

External links 
 Earthquakes in Iceland magnitude 4 and greater, 1706–1990

Iceland
 
Earthquakes
Earthquakes
Earthquakes